The 2010 Asia Oceania Korfball Championship was held in Zhuzhou (China) with 8 national teams in competition, from April 3 to 8. It is the eight edition of the Asia-Oceania Korfball Championship. Chinese Taipei are the defending champions.

First round

Final round 

5th-8th places

Semifinals

Finals matches

Final standings

See also
Asia-Oceania Korfball Championship

References

External links
AOKC at IKF

Asia-Oceania Korfball Championship
Asia Oceania Korfball Championship
Korfball in China